James Geoffrey Atherton (2 April 1923 – 1 February 2010) was a Welsh professional footballer who played as a goalkeeper. He played in the English Football League for Wrexham in the 1940s. He also played for Chester City and Ellesmere Port Town.

References

1923 births
2010 deaths
Welsh footballers
Association football goalkeepers
Chester City F.C. players
Wrexham A.F.C. players
Ellesmere Port Town F.C. players
English Football League players
People from Queensferry, Flintshire
Sportspeople from Flintshire